The New Brunswick Confederation of Regions Party was a political party in the Province of New Brunswick, Canada. It was the only branch of the Confederation of Regions Party of Canada to win any seats. It held official status in the Legislative Assembly between 1991 and 1995, before losing all its seats in the following election.

History

Uprising
In the late 1980s, support for the Progressive Conservative Party of Premier Richard Hatfield had collapsed because of corruption scandals in the government. As well, many English-speaking New Brunswickers were unhappy with the government's promotion of official bilingualism (the use of English and French in public services).

CoR promised to repeal the 1969 Official Languages Act, which made the French language equal for official purposes with English on a province-wide basis. CoR proposed providing government services in French only in areas with a large francophone population. The French-speaking Acadian population believed this to be an anti-francophone policy, so the CoR had no support in areas with large francophone populations.

In the 1988 federal election, the CoR party had considerable success in New Brunswick. CoR nominated candidates in seven of the ten federal ridings in the 1988 election, and won 4.3% of the vote within the province.

Formation
The CoR party's provincial wing was founded in 1989. Miramichi businessman Arch Pafford was elected leader, and former Hatfield cabinet minister Ed Allen became the party's most notable candidate.

1991 provincial election

The party's greatest success came in the 1991 provincial election. Going into the election, the provincial Liberals held all the seats in the legislature, but many conservatives, especially in the Fredericton area and rural southern New Brunswick, were still upset with the PC Party over the bilingualism issue. CoR was able to capitalize on the situation and captured 21.04% of the vote (87,256 votes) and eight seats despite running in only 48 of the 58 ridings. 

The party ran full slates in Northumberland, Westmorland and Victoria counties, which have mixed English-speaking and Acadian populations, and a full slate in the Acadian-but-bilingual Restigouche county. The party also nominated one candidate in Kent County, two in Gloucester County. No candidates for the CoR ran in the very unilingual French Madawaska County. The Progressive Conservatives, which ran a full slate of 58 candidates, received only 20.7% of the vote.

The 1991 election allowed the Confederation of Regions party to sit as the official opposition, and their success prompted pro-bilingual politicians to enshrine section 16.1 in the Charter of Rights to strengthen New Brunswick's bilingualism.  However, the CoR's leader, Arch Pafford, had not been able to win his seat. Danny Cameron was chosen as the interim leader.

Internal divisions
Internal differences resulted in political infighting within the CoR. A rivalry formed between Cameron, who was seen as a moderate within the party, and fellow CoR MLA Brent Taylor, who was seen as more radical. A year after Cameron's election as interim leader, the party executive, president, and council sought to remove him. He resisted. The party council then held a leadership race at a 1992 convention in Campbellton, where Taylor narrowly defeated Cameron and became leader of the CoR, but Cameron and his supporters argued that the race was illegal. Cameron's supporters later gained control over the party's presidency, allowing Cameron to fire a large portion of the party executive and council. CoR MLAs Brent Taylor and Bev Brine were kicked out of the caucus in 1994 due to their ongoing opposition to Cameron. During this period, party membership dropped from 20,000 to 5,000.

Cameron eventually chose to resign the leadership to try to settle the internal divisions affecting the party. The entire party membership were allowed to vote in the race that followed. Pro-Taylor Gary Ewart (not a sitting MLA) was chosen over pro-Cameron Greg Hargrove, but neither Ewart nor caucus leader Ab Rector were able to resolve their differences with Cameron's supporters. Ewart resigned 23 days later, leaving the party in limbo.

1995 provincial election
The executive elected Greg Hargrove leader in time for the 1995 election, but the damage had been done. None of the party Members of the Legislative Assembly were re-elected in 1995, and the party received just 27,684 votes (7.1% of the popular vote), placing them behind the New Democrats.

1999 provincial election
By 1999, Conservative voters were being wooed back by the charismatic leadership of Bernard Lord, who looked poised to return the party to power after ten years in the wilderness. The Confederation of Region Party, now led by Jim Webb, slipped further in the 1999 provincial election to just 2,807 votes (0.7% of the total). Following the election, Colby Fraser, who had run federally for the party in 1988, replaced Webb as leader.

Dissolution
By 2001, the party was little more than a few computer files in Fraser's basement. At that time, Fraser contacted the remaining members, who voted to dissolve the party. The dissolution formally occurred March 31, 2002.

Leaders 
 Arch Pafford (1989–1991)
 Danny Cameron (1991–1992) (interim leader)
 Brent Taylor (1992) - Taylor's election was later deemed illegal
 Danny Cameron (1992–1995)
 Ab Rector (1995) (interim leader)
 Gary Ewart (1995)
 Ab Rector (1995) (interim leader)
 Greg Hargrove (1995–1999)
 Jim Webb (1999)
 Colby Fraser (1999–2002)

Members of the New Brunswick Legislative Assembly 
 Edwin G. Allen, Fredericton North (1991-1995)
 Beverly Brine, Albert (1991-1994)
 Danny Cameron, York South (1991-1995) (leader)
 Greg Hargrove, York North (1991-1995) 
 Ab Rector, Oromocto (1991-1995)
 Brent Taylor, Southwest Miramichi (1991-1994)
 Gordon Willden, Riverview (1991-1995)
 Max White, Sunbury (1991-1995)

Election results 
The CoR Party contested three general elections, with diminishing success.  Despite being shut out of the legislature in 1995, they placed second in a number of ridings while by 1999 they placed fourth in every riding they ran a candidate.

See also 
List of New Brunswick political parties

Further reading 
 Poitras, Jacques. "The Right Fight: Bernard Lord and the Conservative Dilemma" (2004)  Goose Lane Editions.

References

Provincial political parties in New Brunswick
Defunct political parties in Canada
Conservative parties in Canada